Buddhadeb Guha (29 June 1936 – 29 August 2021) was an Indian writer of fiction in Bengali language. Apart from writing, he was a trained singer and a painter too.

Career
Born in Calcutta, Guha studied at St. Xavier's College of the University of Calcutta. He spent his early years in various districts of Eastern Bengal (now Bangladesh). Those days in Rangpur, Jaipurhat and Barisal are depicted in his Rivu series. Some of the Rivu books are dedicated to friends from his youth. He was also the creator of Rijuda, an imaginary character who explores jungles with his sidekick Rudra. The jungles that he wrote about were mainly in Eastern India. Guha received Ananda Puraskar in 1976. He was a chartered accountant by profession.

Apart from writing, Guha was a trained singer of Rabindra Sangeet which he learned at the famous Tagore school of music Dakshinee and later also trained in Hindustani classical music and in old style Tappa songs from Ramkumar Chattopadhyay and Chandidas Mal. 
He was also a gifted painter and towards the end of his life, when his eyesight began to fail and he began to dictate his writings, he fell back on painting which he was self-taught in but was very good at.

Bibliography

Novels

 Aainar Samne (Deys)
 Abhilas (Deys)
 Ababahika (Ananda Pub)
 Aborohi (Ananda Pub)
 Adbhut Lok (Sahityam)
 Alokjhari (Deys)
 Anwesh
 Babli (Sahityam, 1985)
 Baje Chandanpurer Korcha (Deys)
 Bangri Poshir Doo Rattir (Sahityam)
 Banjoytsnai, Sabuj Andhakare (Ananda Pub)
 Basona Kusum (Sahityam)
 Bati Ghar (Sahityam)
 Bhabar Somoi
 Bhorere Age (Ananda Pub)
 Binnyas (Ananda Pub)
 Boi Melate (Sahityam)
 Bonobasar (Deys)
 Bonobiharir Smriticharon (Rriti Prakashon)
 Chabutara
 Chandrayan (Sahityam)
 Changhar e Gaan (Deys)
 Chapras (Ananda Pub)
 Charkanya (Sahityam, 2004)
 Charumati (Sahityam, 2003)
 Chayara Dirgho Holo (Sahityam)
 Chou (Nirmal Sahityam)
 Doshti Uponyas (Ananda Pub)
 Doshti Uponyas (Sahityam)
 Kumudini
 Babli
 Jongli Mohol
 Ragmala
 Chandrayan
 Pakhsat
 Adbhut Lok
 Parijayee
 Basona Kusum
 Du-Nombor (Sahityam)
 Ektu Ushnatar Jonno (Ananda Pub)
 Gunja Phuler Mala (Deep Prakashon)
 Hajarduari (Ananda Pub)
 Halud Bosonto (Ananda Pub)
 Ilmorander Deshe
 Jagmogi (Sahityam)
 Jaoya-Asa (Deys, 1986)
 Jhaki Darshan
 Jolchobi, Anumotir Jonnye (Deys)
 Jongli Mohol (Sahityam)
 Jongoler Journal (Deys)
 Jongol Mahal (Deys)
 Jongol Sambhar (Deys)
 Jongol Mohol
 Bonobasar
 Jongoler Journal
 Paridhi
 Lobongir Jongole
 Jujudhan (Sahityam)
 Kangpokopi (Deys)
 Khelaghar
 Khela Jokhon (Ananda Pub)
 Koeler Kache (Ananda Pub)
 Kojagor (Deys)
 Kumudini (Sahityam)
 Lobongir Jongole (Deys)
 Madhukari (Ananda Pub)
 Mahulsukhar Chithi (Ananda Pub)
 Mandur Rupamoti (Sahityam)
 Mohorra
 Nagno Nirjan (Sahityam)
 Nana Galpa (Deep Prakashon, 2004)
 Oaikiki (Ananda Pub)
 Pakhshat (Sahityam)
 Palashtalir Parshi (Deys, 1985–86)
 Pamori (Sahityam)
 Pancham Prabas
 Panchasti Priyo Golpo (Sahityam)
 Panchoprodip
 Parijat Paring (Ananda Pub)
 Paridhi (Deys)
 Poheli Peyar
 Premer Golpo
 Priyo Galpo (Sahityam)
 Prothom Probas
 Prothomader Jonnye
 Pujor Somoi e (Ananda Pub)
 Ragmala (Sahityam)
 Reunion (Ananda Pub)
 Riya (Deys, 1990)
 Sajhghore, Eka
 Saldungri
 Sanjhbelate (Dey's, 2002)
 Sareng Miya (Deys)
 Sasandiri (Ananda Pub)
 Sabinay Nibedan (Ananda Pub, 1989)
 Samo (Sahityam)
 Sharaswata (Sahityam)
 Sera baro (Bikash, 1999)
 Sogotokti
 Sondheyr Pore (Ananda Pub)
 Sopord (Deys)
 Srestha Golpo
 Sukher Kache
 Ek gharer dui raat

Rivu
 Durer Bhor
 Durer Dupur (Deys)
 Najai
 Parnomochi
 Parijayii (Sahityam, 2000)
 Rivu (Deys, 1992)
 Rivur Sraban (Ananda Pub)
 Rivu [1-4] (Deys)

Rijuda

 Albino (Ananda Pub)
 Aro Dui Rijuda (Sahityam)
 Aro Dui Notun Rijuda Kahini (Sahityam)
 Saptam Ripu
 Teen Nombor
 Aro Tin Rijuda Kahini (Sahityam)
 Bagher Mangsho Ebong Onnyo Shikar (Ananda Pub)
 Bonobibir Bon e (Ananda Pub)
 Duti Rijuda Kahini (Sahityam, 2004)
 Gugunogumbarer Deshe (Ananda Pub)
 Langra Pahan (Ananda Pub)
 Moulir Raat (Ananda Pub)
 Ninikumari r Bagh (Ananda Pub)
 Rijuda Kahini (Sahityam)
 Kuruboker Deshe
 Projati Projapoti
 Jomduar
 Rijuda Samagra [1-5] (Ananda Pub, 1993)
 Rijudar Char Kahini (Sahityam, 2002)
 Rijudar Songe Jongole (Ananda Pub)
 Rijudar Songe Boxer Jongole Ebong (Ananda Pub)
 Rijudar Songe Lobongi Bone (Ananda Pub)
 Rijudar Songe Sodorbone o Anyanyo Golpo (Sahityam)
 Rijudar Songe Sufkor e (Ananda Pub)
 Ru Aha (Ananda Pub)
 Taar Baghoa (Ananda Pub)
 Tin Rijuda (Sahityam)
 Tin Rijuda (Sahityam)

Death 
Buddhadeb Guha died on 29 August 2021 after developing post-COVID-19 health complications.

References

External links
 
 Buddhadeb Guha Section in Library of Congress
 Buddhadeb Guha Section in Boiwala
 Short Biography of Buddhadeb Guha
 

1936 births
2021 deaths
Bengali novelists
Recipients of the Ananda Purashkar
University of Calcutta alumni
Writers from Kolkata
Novelists from West Bengal
20th-century Indian novelists
Deaths from the COVID-19 pandemic in India